Mohammad Waleed (born 28 December 1995) is a Pakistani cricketer. He made his List A debut for Lahore Eagles in the 2012–13 National One Day Cup on 7 March 2013.

References

External links
 

1995 births
Living people
Pakistani cricketers
Lahore Blues cricketers
Lahore Eagles cricketers
Place of birth missing (living people)